This is a list giving breakdowns of the European Parliamentary session from 1999 to 2004.

MEPs
List of members of the European Parliament for Austria, 1999–2004
List of members of the European Parliament for Belgium, 1999–2004
List of members of the European Parliament for Denmark, 1999–2004
List of members of the European Parliament for Finland, 1999–2004
List of members of the European Parliament for France, 1999–2004
List of members of the European Parliament for Germany, 1999–2004
List of members of the European Parliament for Greece, 1999–2004
List of members of the European Parliament for Ireland, 1999–2004
List of members of the European Parliament for Italy, 1999–2004
List of members of the European Parliament for Luxembourg, 1999–2004
List of members of the European Parliament for the Netherlands, 1999–2004
List of members of the European Parliament for Poland, 2004
List of members of the European Parliament for Portugal, 1999–2004
List of members of the European Parliament for Spain, 1999–2004
List of members of the European Parliament for Sweden, 1999–2004
List of members of the European Parliament for the United Kingdom, 1999–2004

Observers
 Observers for Cyprus 2003–2004
 Observers for the Czech Republic 2003–2004
 Observers for Estonia 2003–2004
 Observers for Hungary 2003–2004
 Observers for Latvia 2003–2004
 Observers for Lithuania 2003–2004
 Observers for Malta 2003–2004
 Observers for Poland 2003–2004
 Observers for Slovakia 2003–2004
 Observers for Slovenia 2003–2004

See also
 Member of the European Parliament
 List of members of the European Parliament 1999–2004
 1999 European Parliament election